Lesego Gloria Moeng (born 3 February 1998) is a Motswana footballer who plays as a goalkeeper for BDF and the Botswana women's national team.

Club career
Moeng has played for Geronah in Botswana.

International career
Moeng capped for Botswana at senior level during the 2021 COSAFA Women's Championship and the 2022 Africa Women Cup of Nations qualification.

References

External links

1998 births
Living people
Botswana women's footballers
Women's association football goalkeepers
Botswana women's international footballers